"Chega de Saudade", also known as "No More Blues", is a bossa nova jazz standard. It is often considered to be the first bossa nova song to be recorded. Like "The Girl from Ipanema", the music for "Chega de Saudade" was composed by Antônio Carlos Jobim, with lyrics by Vinícius de Moraes.

Overview
The song was first recorded in 1957 by Brazilian singer Elizete Cardoso and released on her 1958 album, Canção do Amor Demais. However, people took little notice of her release of the song. João Gilberto included the second recorded version in 1958. Released as a single, the song became a hit and would consolidate bossa nova as a permanent genre in the Latin music lexicon. The song also appeared on Gilberto's first album Chega de Saudade.

The title can be translated roughly as "enough longing", though the Portuguese word, saudade, carries a far more complex meaning. The word implies an intensity of heartfelt connection that is yearned for passionately, not unlike feeling withdrawal symptoms from a drug that makes one feel good. Another good analogy might be an intense homesickness. Chega, in this case, means no more, enough.

The song form is 68 measures long. The first 32 measures are in a minor key, followed by 36 measures in a major key. The key of the original recording by Elizete Cardoso went from D minor to D major.

Covers and versions
It has been recorded by jazz and rock performers, with the English language title "No More Blues". English lyrics were written by Jon Hendricks and "Jessie Cavanaugh" (actually a pseudonym for music publisher Howard S. Richmond)
Quincy Jones recorded a version for his "Big Band Bossa Nova" album in 1962.
In 2000, the João Gilberto version was inducted to the Grammy Hall of Fame. A year later, Gilberto's album Chega De Saudade was inducted to the first Latin Grammy Hall of Fame.
The song was recorded by the cellist, Yo-Yo Ma for his album Obrigado Brazil. American jazz vibraphonist Gary Burton also recorded the composition for his 1966 album The Time Machine and his solo album Alone at Last (Atlantic, 1971). In 1984, under the English-language title "No More Blues", it was the opening track on singer Roseanna Vitro's debut LP, Listen Here. Rosa Passos, Stan Getz, Dizzy Gillespie, Toninho Horta, Joe Henderson, The Hi-Lo's, Carmen McRae, and César Camargo Mariano are among other who covered the song.
Eliane Elias included the song in her 1992 album Fantasia and in her 1996 album The Three Americas.
The song was performed by Brazilian metal band Angra at a live acoustic set at the auditorium of the Paris FNAC Forum in 1995. The recording was later featured on their EP "Live Acoustic at FNAC" in 1998.
 The Game Boy Color version of Grand Theft Auto 2 has a chiptune arrangement of the song as its character selection music, composed by Anthony Paton.
 Also recorded by Caroll Vanwelden on Portraits of Brazil (2016).
 Katie Noonan & Karin Schaupp covered the song on their album Songs of the Latin Skies (2017).
 Zule Guerra recorded it for her EP Tres de tres: Brazilian.
 A version of the song was recorded by Geoff Knorr for the soundtrack of Civilization V as the musical theme for the Brazilian civilization.
 Persona 5 Royal's No More What Ifs melody would bear a resemblance to the song and is sung by Lyn Inaizumi, composed by Shoji Meguro (2020).
 Eliane Elias included the song in her albums The Three Americas (1996) and Brazilian Classics (2003).

Recognition
The song was voted by the Brazilian edition of Rolling Stone as the 6th greatest Brazilian song.

References 

Bossa nova songs
Brazilian songs
1958 songs
Grammy Hall of Fame Award recipients
Portuguese-language songs
Songs with music by Antônio Carlos Jobim
Songs with lyrics by Vinicius de Moraes